Girl with a Cat is a portrait painting by Gwen John in the collection of the Metropolitan Museum of Art.

Description 
The work depicts a seated girl holding a black house cat with a window behind her. The figure wears a blue apron with white polka dots.

Early history and creation 
The work was painted before autumn 1921, likely during the late 1910s to early 1920s.

Exhibition history

References 

Paintings in the collection of the Metropolitan Museum of Art
Paintings by Gwen John